Sternbach is a surname. Notable people with the surname include:

Joni Sternbach, American photographer
Leo Sternbach, chemist
Leon Sternbach, philologist
Ludwik Sternbach, Indologist
Rick Sternbach, illustrator